The Morris Federation is one of the three existing umbrella organisations for morris dancing sides in the United Kingdom. It was officially founded as the Women's Morris Federation in 1975 as a direct response to the long-existing Morris Ring which did not allow all-female or mixed sides to join. It was, as the name suggests, originally limited to all-female teams, with an inaugural meeting held at the University of Bath in October 1975. 

In 1980, the Morris Federation opened its doors to mixed teams, and two years later adopted a policy of allowing any team to join, regardless of gender. It was at about this point that the third umbrella group was founded, the Open Morris, which adopted this policy from the start.

The Morris Federation's aims are to:

 Encourage and promote morris and related activities, for anyone who wants to participate or to spectate
 Provide a channel of communication between member sides
 Encourage the improvement of standards of dancing and related activities among its members
Encourage an environment for morris and related activities where all feel safe, welcomed and respected.

The Morris Federation is principally for practising UK-based morris teams, but membership categories exist for interested individuals and overseas teams as well.

References

External links
Morris Federation website

Dance in England
Clubs and societies in England
Morris dance